Haematochiton is a genus of pleasing fungus beetles in the family Erotylidae. There are at least three described species in Haematochiton.

Species
These three species belong to the genus Haematochiton:
 Haematochiton bisculptum Casey
 Haematochiton carbonarius (Gorham, 1888)
 Haematochiton elateroides Gorham, 1888

References

Further reading

 
 

Erotylidae
Articles created by Qbugbot